Kin'ya or Kinya (written: 欣也, 欣哉, 欽也 or キンヤ in katakana) is a masculine Japanese given name. Notable people with the name include:

, Japanese fencer
, Japanese actor and voice actor
, Japanese actor
, Japanese singer and actor
, Japanese high jumper
, Japanese footballer

Japanese masculine given names